Ancyrocephalus is a genus of flatworms belonging to the family Ancyrocephalidae.

The genus was first described by Creplin in 1839.

Species:
 Ancyrocephalus chiapanensis Mendoza-Franco, Caspeta-Mandujano & Ramírez-Martínez, 2018
 Ancyrocephalus paradoxus Creplin, 1839

References

Ancyrocephalidae
Platyhelminthes genera